The Face is a Thai reality television modelling competition series aired on Channel 3 In Thailand. Auditions for the show began on 23 August 2014. The series began to air on television on 4 October 2014.

In 2017, they launched an international men version as The Face Men Thailand.

In 2018, they premiered The Face Thailand All Stars, where losing contestants from 3 previous seasons of The Face Thailand and The Face Men Thailand (season 1) competed for a second chance to win the title. The season  premiered on 10 February 2018.

Hosts and mentors 

 Quit
Marsha Vadhanapanich quit and was replaced by Cris Horwang in Episode 8.
Ploy Chermarn quit in Episode 13.

Seasons

Mentor's color symbols
 Team Lukkade (Season 1–3)
 Team Ploy (Season 1)
 Team Ying (Season 1)
 Team Bee (Season 2–3)
 Team Cris (Season 2–3)
 Team Marsha (Season 3)
 Team Cris and  Lukkade (season 4)
 Team Bee and Rita (season 4)
 Team Ploy and Sonia (season 4)
 Team Toni (Season 5)
 Team Maria (Season 5)
 Team Gina and Bank (Season 5)

 In Season 3 (Episode 8), Marsha Vadhanapanich quit and was replaced by Cris Horwang, so Team Marsha's contestants Grace and Julie are also changed to be Team Cris in this episode.
 In Season 3 (Episode 9), Hana from Team Lukkade returned in Team Cris and Mint from Team Lukkade returned in original team.

 Thai representatives at Face of Asia Color key'  Declared as Face of Asia
  Ended as runner-up
  Ended as one of the quarter-finalists or semi-finalists at Face of Asia

 Face of Thailand 
contestant who appointed as Face of Thailand to represent Thailand in Face of Asia contest at Asia Model Festival

See also
 The Face Men Thailand''

References 

Thai reality television series
2010s Thai television series
2014 Thai television series debuts
2019 Thai television series endings
Thailand
Women
Channel 3 (Thailand) original programming
Thai television series based on American television series